Jeremić is a Serbian surname. It may refer to:

Dragoljub Jeremić (born 1978), footballer
Milan Jeremić (born 1988), footballer
Milan Jeremić (born 1977), basketball player
Mladen Jeremić (born 1988), basketball player
Predrag Jeremić (born 1987), footballer
Slavica Jeremić (born 1957), female handball player
Slaviša Jeremić (born 1983), footballer
Tajana Jeremić (born 1990), model
Vuk Jeremić (born 1975), politician

Serbian surnames